Falköping Municipality (Falköpings kommun) is a municipality in Västra Götaland County in western Sweden. Its seat is located in the town of Falköping.

The present municipality consists of more than 50 original local government units, joined together in two structural reforms carried out in 1952, when the number was reduced to eight, and during the period 1971–1974. In 1971 the former Town of Falköping was made a unitary municipality and three years later amalgamated with the surrounding municipalities.

Localities
The population centres in the municipality include:
 Åsarp 
 Åsle
 Falköping (seat) 
 Floby 
 Gudhem 
 Gökhem
 Kinnarp 
 Kättilstorp 
 Luttra
 Odensberg 
 Stenstorp 
 Torbjörntorp 
 Vartofta

References

External links

Falköping Municipality - Official site

Municipalities of Västra Götaland County
Skaraborg